Helpston (also, formerly, "Helpstone") is an English village in Cambridgeshire.  Historically; it was formerly in the Soke of Peterborough in Northamptonshire, subsequently (1965–1974) in Huntingdon and Peterborough, then in Cambridgeshire.  It is administered by the City of Peterborough unitary authority.

The parish church is dedicated to St Botolph; the chancel window was created by Francis Skeat and depicts "Christ in Majesty".

The poet John Clare was born in Helpston in 1793 and is buried in the churchyard of St Botolph's. The thatched cottage  where he was born was bought by the John Clare Trust in 2005. The John Clare Cottage, at 12 Woodgate, has been restored using traditional building methods and is open to the public. In 2013 the John Clare Trust received a grant from the Heritage Lottery Fund to help preserve the building and provide educational activities for youngsters visiting the cottage.
John Clare Primary School is named after the poet. 

The name Helpston is Anglo-Saxon in origin and means the farmstead (tun) first settled by Help (an Old English personal name).
Helpston is well known for its athletics club, Helpston Harriers AC, who aspire to improve local running standards.

Gallery

History
In July 1822 it was reported that a deodand of 20 shillings was laid upon the cart held responsible for the death of John Price, aged twelve, the driver of the cart. The inquest was held at the Bell Inn. Deodands were abolished under the Deodands Act 1846 24 years later.

See also
Helpston railway station

References

External links

 Helpston Parish Website
 A website about the village
 Clare Cottage

Villages in Cambridgeshire
Civil parishes in Cambridgeshire
Geography of Peterborough